Dorje Lhakpa is a mountain in the Jugal Himal, southeast of Langtang valley in Nepal.

Visible also from Kathmandu valley it has an elegant pyramid-shaped figure and is an ideal target for photographers and mountaineers. Considered by many of intermediate difficulty with easiest route from the west ridge. Its climb is offered by many trekking and mountaineering agencies in Nepal.

Climbing history 

The first attempt and successful climb recorded is by a Japanese expedition in the late 1960s by the west ridge.

In 1986, a German–Nepalese expedition (Klaus Stark (leader of the expedition), Mathias Rau, Helmut Müller, Bernd Mayer (doctor), Thomas Oeser from T.A.K. (Turner-Alpen-Kränzchen), a German section of the DAV, German alpine club, and the Nepalese Joint-Members Ang Pasang (Sirdar) and Pemba Tharke) reached the mountain from the southern Balephi Khola and attempt to climb it over the west ridge. On July 11, 1986, Helmut Müller, Bernd Mayer reached the summit separately; Müller is forced to bivouac at  while descending.

Another attempt was made by a 7-member-team Italian expedition ADC89 during fall of 1989, again from the west ridge and approach from south. The climb was stopped after Camp 1 at approx 6100 m due to unstable snow and avalanche danger on the ridge.

In the following years (1991?) a German expedition successfully climbed the mountain again by the west ridge.

In 1992, Carlos Buhler made a solo climb of Dorje Lhakpa. Buhler did not intend initially to climb solo. The climb became a solo of the West Ridge after Carlos' partner, Jon Aylward, became ill at base camp. Buhler described the climb in the 1993 American Alpine Journal.

Another successful expedition was a French team of four in 2001.

References

External links 
 View from Nagarkot, Nepal
  Climb short description
 2001 successful climb description

Mountains of the Bagmati Province
Six-thousanders of the Himalayas